Yohance Marshall (born January 22, 1986) is a Trinidadian footballer who last played for Kórdrengir in the 3. deild karla in Iceland.

Career

Youth and college
Born in Diego Martin, Trinidad and Tobago, Marshall attended high school at St. Anthony's College in Trinidad, he led the school team to three intercollegiate titles while captaining the team in 2004 and playing in a star-studded team including future internationals Kenwyne Jones, Julius James, and Jan-Michael Williams.

In 2005, Marshall earned a scholarship to attend the University of South Florida, helping USF reach the final stages of the NCAA Tournament in three of his four years, and consequently named as an NSCAA Second Team All-American, a College Soccer News First Team All- American, and to the All-Big East First Team in his senior year. He also served as USF's team captain from 2006 to 2008 and started all 73 games he appeared in, scoring 7 times and assisting 6.

Professional
Despite a predicted first round pick, a poor performance in the Major League Soccer (MLS) Combine saw Marshall undrafted during 2009 MLS SuperDraft. However, two weeks later Marshall was signed by Los Angeles Galaxy in February 2009, after playing with the team during the 2009 pre-season, including the Pan-Pacific Championship. He made his professional debut for them on April 7, 2009, in the Lamar Hunt U.S. Open Cup against Colorado Rapids.

Marshall was sent on loan to USL-1 side Austin Aztex in June 2009, and again prior to the 2010 season. He scored his first professional goal for Austin on May 19, 2010 in a 3–3 draw with FC Tampa Bay, going on to score three goals that season. He made his MLS debut with the Galaxy on September 18, 2010, starting against DC United after an emergency recall from Austin.

On January 25, 2011 the Galaxy announced that his contract option would not be picked up for the 2011 season, and Vermont Voltage from the USL Premier Development League moved quickly to sign him on a short-term contract. On June 8, 2011, the Rochester Rhinos of the USL Professional Division announced that they had signed Yohance Marshall for the remainder of the season, which saw them go on to win the USL Regular Season

On March 6, 2012, Marshall signed a two-year contract with Thai Premier League side, Chainat FC. He made his debut on May 26, 2012, in a 2–2 draw against Thai Port F.C. In August 2012, Marshall and Chainat FC decided to terminate the contract by mutual consent.

On December 10, 2012, Marshall signed a one-year contract with Myanmar National League side Nay Pyi Taw F.C. Marshall made his debut for Nay Pyi Taw F.C. on January 12, 2013, in a 1–1 draw against Ayeyawady United F.C. He scored his first goal for the club in dramatic fashion, as he grabbed the game-winning goal against Hantharwady United football club in 90+5 minutes of the game to give Nay Pyi Taw F.C. their first win of the season. After a successful first half of the season in the Myanmar top-flight, Marshall was selected for a Foreign Player All-star team that will play against the Myanmar national football team. Marshall came off the bench to start the second half of the All-Star game with the Foreign team trailing 1-0. He scored a header from a corner kick to equalized the game. The foreign All-Star team went on to win the game 2–1. Marshall finished the season with three goals in 21 games and went the entire season without being shown a card. He helped Nay Pyi Taw F.C. qualify for the AFC Cup for the first time in their short history with a runner-up finish in the Myanmar National League.

Marshall transferred to Central FC in Trinidad and Tobago at the season's close. A regular in their Defence, his performances have recently earned praise in the popular press. He made his debut for Central FC on January 24, 2014, in a goalless draw against Point Fortin Civic F.C. He has played in every game since joining the Sharks in the January transfer window while helping them go 17 games without a loss while stifling opposing attacks. In his 20 games for the club he surmounted 13 wins 5 draws and only 2 losses. Marshall also help guide Central to their second piece of silverware for the season by winning the Trinidad and Tobago Goal Shield over arch-rivals W Connection F.C. Marshall also helped Central FC for the CONCACAF Champions League qualifying berth by finishing second in the league. For his performances since joining Central FC, Marshall was recalled to the Trinidad and Tobago national football team for two upcoming friendly internationals game before the World Cup 2014

On January 11, 2015, Marshall signed a one-year contract with Salvadoran Primera División side, Juventud Independiente. Marshall debuted with Juventud Independiente on January 18, 2015, playing 90 minutes in a 4–2 win over C.D. Pasaquina. In his first Clausura season in El Salvador, Juventud Independiente qualified for the semifinals eventually losing to Santa Tecla F.C.

After scoring a 94th minute equalizing goal during Trinidad and Tobago's 4–4 draw with Mexico at the 2015 CONCACAF Gold Cup, Yohance Marshall was approached by Ascenso MX side Murciélagos FC. He made his debut on August 29, 2015 coming off the bench in the second half of a 2–1 loss away at FC Juárez.

International
Marshall represented Trinidad and Tobago at the U-17, U-20 and U-21 level, and played for his country in a number of qualifiers for the 2008 Beijing Olympics. Marshall got his first cap for the Trinidad and Tobago national football team in October 2010, in a friendly match against local Concacaf rivals Jamaica. He represented Trinidad and Tobago again by helping them qualify for the Caribbean Cup held in Martinique in November 2010. Marshall was recalled to represent Trinidad and Tobago national football team in May 2014 for two Friendly Internationals games against Argentina national football team and Iran national football team respectively in their preparation for the FIFA World Cup 2014

At the 2015 CONCACAF Gold Cup, Marshall scored a 94th minute equalising goal during Trinidad and Tobago's 4–4 draw with Mexico.

International goals
Scores and results list Trinidad and Tobago's goal tally first.

Honours

LA Galaxy
 MLS Western Conference Regular Season 2009, 2010
 MLS Cup Playoffs 2009
 MLS Supporter's Shield 2010

Rochester Rhinos
 USL Pro Regular Season

Central FC
Trinidad and Tobago Goal Shield Winners (1) 2014

Personal
 Myanmar All Star player 2013

References

External links

1986 births
Living people
Trinidad and Tobago footballers
Trinidad and Tobago international footballers
South Florida Bulls men's soccer players
LA Galaxy players
Austin Aztex FC players
Vermont Voltage players
Rochester New York FC players
Trinidad and Tobago expatriate footballers
Expatriate soccer players in the United States
USL First Division players
USSF Division 2 Professional League players
Major League Soccer players
USL League Two players
USL Championship players
TT Pro League players
Central F.C. players
2014 Caribbean Cup players
2015 CONCACAF Gold Cup players
Expatriate footballers in Mexico
Expatriate footballers in El Salvador
Expatriate footballers in Thailand
Association football defenders
Trinidad and Tobago expatriate sportspeople in the United States
Trinidad and Tobago expatriate sportspeople in Mexico
Trinidad and Tobago expatriate sportspeople in El Salvador
Trinidad and Tobago expatriate sportspeople in Thailand
Kórdrengir players
University of South Florida alumni